Luigi Berlinguer (born 25 July 1932) is an Italian politician who served in the government of Italy as minister of education from 1996 to 2000. He is a member of the Democratic Party.

Early life and education
Berlinguer was born in Sassari on 25 July 1932. His brother was Sergio, who was a diplomat and politician. They are cousin of communist leader Enrico Berlinguer, who died in 1984. He obtained a law degree from the University of Sassari in 1955.

Career
Berlinguer served as mayor of Sennori. He was the president of the University of Siena until April 1993 when he was appointed to the Ciampi Cabinet as minister of universities, science and technology. He was one of the three ex-communists in the cabinet. Then he served as the minister of education between 1996 and 2000 in the cabinets led first by Romano Prodi and then by Massimo D'Alema. He was also acting minister of universities, science and technology from 1996 to October 1998. He was succeeded by Oreste Zecchino as minister. In addition, he served in both the Chamber of Deputies and the Italian Senate.

He is a member of the Democratic Party. He was elected as a member of the European Parliament in 2009, sitting as part of the Progressive Alliance of Socialists and Democrats. In the parliament he served as first vice-chair of the committee on legal affairs and as a member of the committee on culture and education beginning in 2009.

Awards
In 2011, Berlinguer received MEP award of the European Parliament in the field of culture and education.

Honour
  Order of Merit of the Italian Republic (Knight Grand Cross; 27 December 1992)

References

External links

1932 births
deputies of Legislature IV of Italy
deputies of Legislature XII of Italy
Deputies of Legislature XIII of Italy
Italian people of Catalan descent
Italian Communist Party politicians
Democratic Party of the Left politicians
Democrats of the Left politicians
Education ministers of Italy
Government ministers of Italy
Grand Crosses with Star and Sash of the Order of Merit of the Federal Republic of Germany
senators of Legislature XIV of Italy
Democratic Party (Italy) MEPs
MEPs for Italy 2009–2014
Heads of universities in Italy
Living people
People from Sassari
University of Sassari alumni
Academic staff of the University of Siena
Mayors of places in Italy
Knights Grand Cross of the Order of Merit of the Italian Republic